Culhuacan or Culhuacán may refer to:

 Colhuacan (altepetl), a pre-Columbian city-state of the Valley of Mexico
 Pueblo Culhuacán, a neighborhood of the Iztapalapa borough of modern Mexico City
 Culhuacán metro station, a Mexico City Metro station

See also
 Acolhuacan, a pre-Columbian province in the east of the Valley of Mexico